The Sony Cyber-shot DSC-WX500 is a digital selfie compact camera, which can zoom up to 30x; equivalent to 24–720 mm. The WX500 is mainly used for selfies, not made for vlogging (but can still be used for vlogging).

Its TFT LCD screen can tilt up to 180º, it has a built-in flash and a built-in AF illuminator (Assist lamp). It also has an Exmor R CMOS sensor and a BIONZ X image processing engine. Its customizable ring is borrowed from the Sony Cyber-shot DSC-RX100, around the front of the lens. The camera also has built-in Wi-Fi with NFC with downloadable apps, but no GPS. The WX500 features Optical Image Stabilisation.

Its sibling is the Sony Cyber-shot DSC-HX90V. Its predecessor is the DSC-HX50V, and its successor the DSC-WX300.

Structure 

It has a smooth, plastic, rigid body that covers the interior. The grip is a narrow, thin "ditch" on the front of the camera.

Its lenses are made of Zeiss glass to make the image look professional.

History 

First produced in April 2015 and is still in production as of July 2019, along with its sibling HX90V first produced in June 2015.

References

External links 
Information

Cyber-shot cameras
Cameras introduced in 2015